Everything Is Everything may refer to:

An album:
Everything Is Everything (Diana Ross album), a 1970 album by Diana Ross
Everything Is Everything (Donny Hathaway album), a 1970 album by Donny Hathaway
Everything Is Everything (Brand Nubian album), a 1994 album by Brand Nubian
Everything is Everything, a 2005 album by Beats and Styles

A song:
"Everything Is Everything" (Lauryn Hill song), a 1998 single by Lauryn Hill from the album The Miseducation of Lauryn Hill
"Everything Is Everything" (Phoenix song), a 2004 single by Phoenix from the album Alphabetical

A band:
Everything Is Everything, an American band featuring Jim Pepper, best known for their 1969 song "Witchi Tai To"